ECAC can refer to:
 Eastern College Athletic Conference, a sports federation of colleges and universities in the eastern United States
 ECAC Hockey, an American collegiate ice hockey conference in the United States
 European Civil Aviation Conference, a European intergovernmental civil air transport organization established to promotes the continued development of a safe, efficient, and sustainable European air transport system